This is a list of adverse effects of the antidepressant trazodone, sorted by frequency of occurrence.

Very common
Very common (>10% incidence) adverse effects include:
 Blurred vision
 Dizziness
 Somnolence
 Dry mouth
 Nausea
 Headache
 Fatigue

Common
Common (1–10% incidence) adverse effects include:
 Vomiting
 Constipation
 Diarrhea
 Backache
 Confusion
 Insomnia
 Dream disorder
 Disorientation
 Incoordination
 Nasal congestion
 Orthostatic hypotension
 Syncope
 Tremor
 Weight change
 Anxiety
 Hypotension
 Oedema
  Lack of coordination
 Dysgeusia
 Memory impairment
 Migraine
 Paraesthesia
 Agitation
 Dyspnoea
 Night sweats

Uncommon
Uncommon (0.1–1% incidence) adverse effects include:
 Hypersensitivity reaction
 Muscle twitching
 Amnesia
 Aphasia
 Hypoesthesia
 Speech disorder
 Bladder pain
 Urinary incontinence
 Gait disturbance
 Reflux oesophagitis
 Dry eye
 Eye pain
 Photophobia
 Hypoacusis
 Tinnitus
 Vertigo
 Acne
 Hyperhidrosis
 Photosensitivity reaction
 Flushing

Rare
Rare (<0.1%) adverse effects include:
 Urinary retention
 Prolonged QT interval
 Torsades de Pointes
 Ataxia
 Breast enlargement or engorgement
 Lactation
 Cardiospasm
 Stroke
 Chills
 Cholestasis
 Clitorism
 Congestive heart failure
 Diplopia
 Extrapyramidal symptoms
 Hallucinations
 Haemolytic anaemia
 Hirsutism
 Hyperbilirubinaemia
 Increased amylase
 Increased salivation
 Leukocytosis
 Leukonychia
 Jaundice
 Liver enzyme alterations
 Methemoglobinemia
 Paraesthesia
 Paranoid reaction
 Stupor
 Rash
 Seizure
 Priapism
 Pruritus
 Psoriasis
 Psychosis
 Suicidal ideation
 Suicidal behaviour
 Syndrome of inappropriate antidiuretic hormone secretion
 Tardive dyskinesia
 Serotonin syndrome
 Unexplained death
 Urticaria
 Vasodilation

References

Trazodone